The Central Vermont Railway  was a railroad that operated in the U.S. states of Connecticut, Massachusetts, New Hampshire, New York, and Vermont, as well as the Canadian province of Quebec.

It connected Montreal, Quebec, with New London, Connecticut, using a route along the shores of Lake Champlain, through the Green Mountains and along the Connecticut River valley, as well as Montreal to Boston, Massachusetts, through a connection with the Boston and Maine Railroad at White River Junction, Vermont.

History

The Vermont Central Railroad was chartered October 31, 1843, to build a line across the center of Vermont, running from Burlington on Lake Champlain east to Montpelier, and then southeast and south to Windsor on the Connecticut River. Initial plans had the main line running through Montpelier. However, due to the difficulty of building through the Williamstown Gulf, a narrow valley south of Barre, Vermont, and to land interests of Charles Paine in Northfield, Vermont, a course to the west was selected, leaving the state capital to be served by a short branch line. Construction began on December 15, 1845, and the first section, from White River Junction west to Bethel, opened on June 26, 1848. Subsequent sections opened to Roxbury on September 17, 1848, Northfield on October 10, 1848, Montpelier (including the branch from Montpelier Junction) on June 20, 1849, Middlesex on August 30, 1849, Waterbury on September 29, 1849, and the full distance to Burlington on December 31, 1849. The part along the Connecticut River from Hartford south to Windsor opened on February 13, 1849.

The Vermont and Canada Railroad was chartered October 31, 1845, as a continuation of the Vermont Central north and west to Rouses Point, New York, splitting at Essex Junction, Vermont (east of Burlington) and running north via St. Albans and Swanton. A branch split at Swanton and ran north to the border with Canada. On August 24, 1849, the Vermont Central leased the Vermont and Canada, and it was completed in 1851. However, the Vermont Central defaulted on rental payments, and the Vermont and Canada returned to its original owners on June 28, 1852. The lease was later reinstated.

The Montreal and Vermont Junction Railway was chartered in 1860 and opened in the 1860s, extending the Vermont and Canada's branch from the international border north to St. Johns, Quebec, on the Grand Trunk Railway's Montreal and Champlain Railroad. From opening it was operated as an extension of the Vermont and Canada.

The Sullivan County Railroad continued south from Windsor to Bellows Falls, Vermont, where it met the Cheshire Railroad towards Boston. At first it was operated by the Central Vermont, but later the Boston and Maine Railroad gained control of it, giving trackage rights to the Central Vermont. Similarly, the Vermont Valley Railroad, running south from Bellows Falls to the New London Northern Railroad in Brattleboro, was originally owned by the Rutland Railroad and later by the B&M.

In 1867 the Vermont Central leased the Stanstead, Shefford and Chambly Railroad, running east from St. Johns to Waterloo, Quebec. The Waterloo and Magog Railway was later built as an extension from Waterloo south to Magog.

The Vermont Central leased the Ogdensburg and Lake Champlain Railroad on March 1, 1870, extending its line from Rouses Point west to Ogdensburg, New York. On January 1, 1871, the Vermont Central leased the Rutland Railroad system, giving it routes from Burlington to Bellows Falls, Vermont, and Chatham, New York. The New London Northern Railroad was leased on December 1, 1871. On November 2, 1872, the name was changed to the Central Vermont Railroad.

Though chartered as an independent entity in 1867, control of the Missisquoi Railroad was gained shortly thereafter, and it was formally leased in July 1873, providing a branch from St. Albans northeast to Richford, Vermont. It was operated until November 15, 1877, when the Connecticut and Passumpsic Rivers Railroad took it over. The company was reorganized in December 1886 as the Missisquoi Valley Railway, and was once again leased to the Central Vermont.

The Montpelier and White River Railroad opened in 1876 and was leased to the Central Vermont, running from the end of the Montpelier Branch south to and beyond Barre.

The Consolidated Railway was formed on June 30, 1884, to consolidate the Central Vermont and Vermont and Canada and to settle litigation between the two companies. A new Central Vermont Railroad was formed on July 1, 1884 to take over from the Consolidated Railway.

In 1889 the Burlington and Lamoille Railroad was reorganized as the Burlington and Lamoille Valley Railroad and leased by the Central Vermont. This provided a branch from Essex Junction to the Lamoille Valley Railroad at Cambridge Junction in Cambridge, Vermont, and a quickly-abandoned redundant line from Essex Junction west to Burlington. This second connection crossed the Winooski River near Essex Junction and connected to the Rutland Railroad at the south end of Burlington near the present-day terminus of I-189.

The Montreal and Province Line Railway was formed in 1896 as a reorganization of the Montreal, Portland and Boston Railroad. Originally planned as a branch of the Portland and Ogdensburg Railroad to Montreal, and operated by the Connecticut and Passumpsic Rivers Railroad, it was taken over by the Central Vermont upon reorganization. The main line ran from the Grand Trunk Railway's Montreal and Champlain Railroad at Saint-Lambert, across the St. Lawrence River from Montreal, southeast to Farnham on the Stanstead, Shefford and Chambly Railroad, with an extension continuing southeast to Frelighsburg. A branch went east from Marieville to St. Cesaire.

In 1896 the Central Vermont entered receivership, and the Rutland Railroad was separated. The Grand Trunk Railway bought the bankrupt company on March 20. The Ogdensburg and Lake Champlain Railroad lease ended in 1898, and that company was leased by the Rutland in 1901. The Central Vermont Railroad was sold at foreclosure on March 21, 1899, and was reorganized as the Central Vermont Railway on May 1. During this process, on April 15, 1899, it purchased the Missisquoi Valley Railroad outright.

On July 12, 1920, the entire Grand Trunk system was placed under the control of a "Board of Management" by the federal Department of Railways and Canals in Canada after several years of financial difficulties. After several years of legal battles by Grand Trunk shareholders, intent on preventing the federal government from nationalizing the company, the company was nationalized on January 20, 1923, and fully merged into the Crown corporation Canadian National Railway.

CN and NECR: 1923-present
On December 12, 1927, the Central Vermont Railway entered receivership again, and was reorganized January 31, 1930, to form a new company of the same name.

While the Central Vermont was no longer independent, it kept much of its corporate identity and was run as a separate railroad from the rest of the CN system. As the grip of the Great Depression eased, the railroad became a relatively successful arm of the CN network until the postwar period. It moved a wide range of freight from general merchandise and furniture to milk and agricultural products.

During the 1950s, diesels from CN began to appear on the Central Vermont, with the last steam locomotive ending service in 1957. The 1960s were an especially-rough period due to declining traffic, rising costs, and falling revenues.

Under the Grand Trunk and later the Canadian National, the Central Vermont system saw many of its unprofitable branch lines abandoned. The CN continued to operate the CV as a modestly successful system; however, in the process leading up to the privatization of the CN, which took place on November 28, 1995, several non-core routes were identified for sale, one of then being the CV.

On February 3, 1995, the CN sold the CV mainline from New London, Connecticut, to East Alburg, Vermont, to shortline operating company RailTex, which renamed the property the New England Central Railroad. RailTex was merged into RailAmerica in 2000. Genesee & Wyoming acquired RailAmerica at the end of 2012. Operations have continued as before.

Divisions and branches

Richford Branch
This line was formed as the Missisquoi Railroad, then became the Missisquoi Valley Railroad, and then the Missisquoi Valley Division, before gaining its final name. Operations continued on the entire  length until 1984, when a derailment on the bridge spanning the Missisquoi River near Sheldon, Vermont, forced the dismantlement of one of three spans. Operations continued on the east end, while the Lamoille Valley Railroad operated on the isolated west end of the line to Richford occasionally after 1989. In 1990 the tracks from St. Albans to the bridge were pulled up.

The following stops were made on the branch from west to east:
 Saint Albans, Vermont (interchange with the Central Vermont Railway)
 Green's Corners, Vermont
 Sheldon Springs, Vermont
 Sheldon, Vermont (interchange with the Missisquoi Pulp and Paper Company)
 North Sheldon, Vermont
 Sheldon Junction, Vermont (interchange with the Saint Johnsbury and Lake Champlain Railroad)
 East Frankin, Vermont
 Enosburg Falls, Vermont
 North Enosburg, Vermont
 East Berkshire, Vermont
 Richford, Vermont (interchange with the Canadian Pacific Railway)

References

External links

Central Vermont Railway Historical Society
The Central Vermont Railway at George Elwood's Fallen Flags site
Picturing the Past: The Central Vermont Railway - includes many railway photos
Mamacoke Company Portal to Central Vermont Railway Archives

 
Railway companies established in 1899
Railway companies disestablished in 1995
American companies established in 1899
American companies disestablished in 1995
Grand Trunk Railway subsidiaries
Canadian National Railway subsidiaries
Defunct Connecticut railroads
Defunct Massachusetts railroads
Defunct New Hampshire railroads
Defunct Vermont railroads
Defunct Quebec railways
Former Class I railroads in the United States
Standard gauge railways in the United States
Predecessors of the Grand Trunk Railway
Defunct New York (state) railroads
Historic American Engineering Record in Vermont
1899 establishments in Vermont